Papua New Guinea competed at the 2011 Commonwealth Youth Games in Isle of Man from 7 to 13 September 2011.The Papua New Guinea Olympic Committee & Commonwealth Games Association selected 7 competitors. None of them won any medals.

References

2011 Commonwealth Youth Games
2011